Lady Jean Graham Sibylle Violet Fforde  (née Graham; 11 November 1920 – 13 October 2017) was a British aristocrat and Arran landowner, who worked as a codebreaker at Bletchley Park. She is known for auctioning off 1000 acres of Arran farmland to pay for central heating in her island cottage.

Early life

She was the daughter of The 6th Duke of Montrose and his wife, Lady Mary Louise Douglas-Hamilton. She was born in Edinburgh and spent much of her childhood at Castle Buchanan on Loch Lomond. In the summer she would spend a lot of time with the royalty of Monaco, including Prince Rainier III of Monaco, husband of Grace Kelly and Princess Antoinette. She described the times they spent together as being great fun, and they spent their days playing and eating cookies.

Lady Jean Fforde enjoyed balls and parties, and she came out as a debutante in 1939 where she was presented to King George VI.

Career
Her father, who was The 6th Duke of Montrose, spoke to the then Lord Louis Mountbatten (who later became The 1st Earl Mountbatten of Burma), which led to her getting a job as a "temporary assistant" at the government code and cypher school called Bletchley Park. Whilst working here she joined more than 8000 women in their mission to break German codes to help end the war. Thanks to her and all the other workers, this resulted in ending the war two years early.

Fforde also authored a memoir called Feet on the Ground: From Castle to Catastrophe. In this book she wrote about her personal experiences, travels and adventures. She also described her experience at Bletchley Park as a "rather dull chapter in an otherwise colourful life" and she goes on to say that "it was excessively boring. It was not as glamorous as subsequent books and films have made it appear".  Fforde described Alan Turing, the mathematical genius who worked at Bletchley Park, as a “very nice man, who should have had public recognition. He was a lovely man, an accessible man. Sweet, handsome, shabby, nail-bitten, sometimes halting in speech and awkward in manner". Fforde worked under Alan Turing in Hut 8 of Bletchley Park. She described her time there as "dull" and that the men working there were less pleasant, and the food inedible.

Personal life
In 1947, the then Lady Jean Graham married Colonel John Fforde, who she later divorced in 1957. They had a son together called Charles Fforde. They spent a lot of time travelling, and they lived in Palestine, Sierra Leone and Northern Rhodesia.

Ancestry

References

1920 births
2017 deaths
British debutantes
Daughters of British dukes
Deputy Lieutenants of Ayrshire and Arran
Nobility from Edinburgh
Bletchley Park women